Brian J. Winton (born 28 July 1963) is a former Australian rules footballer who played with Richmond, Essendon and St Kilda in the Victorian Football League (VFL).

Winton was a gifted forward in his youth, topping the goal-kicking in the 1982 Under-19s competition.
 The former Wentworth played was promoted to the Richmond seniors in 1983. He was used mostly as a defender in the VFL and crossed to Essendon after just one season at Richmond.

In his first two seasons with Essendon, the club won premierships, and as a result he was only able to break into the team on three occasions during this time. After another brief season in 1986, Winton played 20 of a possible 22 games in the 1987 VFL season, playing as a full-back. When Essendon were unable to satisfy his salary expectations, he was released by the club and signed by St Kilda, with the first pick of the pre-season draft.

Although he kicked three goals on his St Kilda debut, against the Brisbane Bears, Winton played just four more league games. He then played for both Prahran and Sandringham in the Victorian Football Association, followed by a stint as coach of Cheltenham from 1996 to 1999 .

References

1963 births
Living people
Australian rules footballers from New South Wales
Richmond Football Club players
Essendon Football Club players
St Kilda Football Club players
Prahran Football Club players
Sandringham Football Club players
New South Wales Australian rules football State of Origin players